The 1901 Southwestern Louisiana Industrial football team was an American football team that represented the Southwestern Louisiana Industrial Institute (now known as the University of Louisiana at Lafayette) as an independent during the 1901 college football season. In their first year under head coach Ashby Woodson, the team compiled a 2–0 record. This is the first season of what is now Louisiana Ragin' Cajuns football.

Schedule

References

Southwestern Louisiana
Louisiana Ragin' Cajuns football seasons
College football undefeated seasons
Southwestern Louisiana Industrial football